The men's 3000 metres steeplechase event at the 2008 African Championships in Athletics was held at the Addis Ababa Stadium on May 2.

Results

References
Results (Archived)

2008 African Championships in Athletics
Steeplechase at the African Championships in Athletics